means "token" in Italian.

The  was introduced in 1927 by STIPEL and subsequently adopted by other telephone companies. The last version of it (as reproduced in the picture below) was produced from 1959 to 1980. In this last version, the  had the date marked on it in the form of a four digit number at the bottom of the obverse side of the token. The first two digits represent the year in which the token was minted.  The last two digits represent the month.  Example: "7805" represents "May 1978".  Its use ceased in 2001, coinciding with the upcoming introduction of the euro currency in 2002.

Gettone as means of payment

In the 1970s the value of the metal used in Italian small coins had reached a higher value than the face value.

 became so common and so well known that they were considered legal tender, almost always being accepted as payment. One  was valued 50 lire up to 1980, 100 lire up to 1984, and 200 lire from 1984. The  thus became known as a typical Italian item even outside of Italy.

See also
Telephone token
Jeton

References

External links
Picture of the gettone telefonico

Token coins